Filip Cveticanin (born 19 June 1996) is a Portuguese male volleyball player for the Portugal national team. His parents, both with sporting background, moved from Serbia to Portugal in 1994. He started to play volleyball at the age of 14 for GDC Gueifaes and later signed for Castelo Maia GC, before joining Benfica in 2017. 199 cm high, he plays as middle blocker.

After participating in the Portugal national junior team, Cveticanin made a debut for the senior national team at 2015 FIVB Volleyball World League, and has played since in the 2016 World League and qualifying games for the 2017 European Championships.

Honours
Benfica
Portuguese First Division: 2018–19
Portuguese Cup: 2018–19

References

External links
 Profile at FIVB.org
 Filip Cveticanin: «É fácil progredir quando se está com os melhores», 

1996 births
Living people
Sportspeople from Funchal
Portuguese men's volleyball players
Portuguese people of Serbian descent
S.L. Benfica volleyball players